Onthophagus medorensis is a species of dung beetle in the family Scarabaeidae.

References

Further reading

 

Scarabaeinae
Articles created by Qbugbot
Beetles described in 1929